Ali Salih al-Sa'di (1928 – September 19, 1977) was an Iraqi politician. He was General Secretary of the Iraqi branch of the Baath Party from the late 1950s until the November 1963 Iraqi coup d'état. From February 8, 1963 (Ramadan Revolution) until the November 1963 Iraqi coup d'état, he was Deputy Prime Minister under Ahmed Hassan al-Bakr, Minister of the Interior and as Commander of the National Guard (Al-Hars al-Qawmi).

Career 

Ali Salih as-Sa'di was born into an Arab-Kurdish family. In 1955 he graduated from Baghdad University with a degree in economics and joined the Baath Party in Iraq. On July 14, 1958, military leaders under Abd al-Karim Qasim overthrew the Hashemite monarchy. Prominent members of the Baath Party violently opposed Qasim, forcing them into exile. In 1959, Saddam Hussein was injured in an attempt to assassinate Qasim and went into exile via Syria (then part of the United Arab Republic) to Cairo, Egypt. Ali al-Sa'di remained in Baghdad as General Secretary of the Iraqi branch of the Ba'ath Party.

Ramadan Revolution 
The Ba'ath Party overthrew and executed Qasim in a violent coup on February 8, 1963. Initially, many of Qasim's Shi'ite supporters believed that he had merely gone into hiding and would appear like the Mahdi to lead a rebellion against the new government; to counter this sentiment and terrorize his supporters, Qasim's dead body was displayed on television in a five minute long propaganda video called The End of the Criminals that included close-up views of his bullet wounds amid disrespectful treatment of his corpse, which is spat on in the final scene. As the secretary general of the Ba'ath Party, al-Sa'di was effectively the new leader of Iraq; through his control of the National Guard militia (commanded by Mundhir al-Wanadawi), al-Sa'di exercised more power than the Prime Minister—prominent Ba'athist general Ahmed Hassan al-Bakr—or the largely ceremonial president, Abdul Salam Arif. The nine-month rule of al-Sa'di and his civilian branch of the Ba'ath Party has been described as "a reign of terror" as the National Guard, under orders from the Revolutionary Command Council (RCC) "to annihilate anyone who disturbs the peace," detained, tortured, or executed thousands of suspected Qasim loyalists. Furthermore, the National Guard—which developed from a core group of perhaps 5,000 civilian Ba'athist partisans but increased to 34,000 members by August 1963, with members identified by their green armbands—was poorly-disciplined, as militiamen engaged in extensive infighting, creating a widespread perception of chaos and disorder. Marion Farouk-Sluglett and Peter Sluglett describe the Ba'athists as having cultivated a "profoundly unsavory image" through "acts of wanton brutality" on a scale without prior precedent in Iraq, including "some of the most terrible scenes of violence hitherto experienced in the post-war Middle East".

There has been considerable academic discussion of allegations from King Hussein of Jordan and others that the Central Intelligence Agency (CIA) (or other U.S. agencies) provided the Ba'athist government with lists of communists and other leftists, who were then arrested or killed by the National Guard under al-Wanadawi's and al-Sa'di's direction. Bryan R. Gibson and Hanna Batatu emphasize that the identities of Iraqi Communist Party (ICP) members were publicly known and that the Ba'ath would not have needed to rely on U.S. intelligence to identify them, whereas Nathan J. Citino considers the allegations plausible because the U.S. embassy in Iraq had actually compiled such lists, and because National Guard members involved in the purge received training in the U.S. Between 300 and 5,000 communist sympathizers were killed in street fighting in Baghdad, along with 80 Ba'ath Party members.

Al-Sa'di was in favor of a radical socialist course, which was not universally accepted in the Iraqi branch of the Baath party. In the first decade of its existence, it focused on pan-Arab slogans, only vaguely mentioning socialism. Such a policy was also opposed by those officers who supported the new government, although they did not belong to the Baath party, but opted for pan-Arabism and the union with Egypt.

Partisan maneuvers and overthrow 
In October 1963, at the all-Arab Sixth Congress (National Congress) of the Baath Party in Damascus, al-Sa'di managed to get founders Michel Aflaq and Salah al-Din al-Bitar voted out of office. On November 11, al-Sa'di and his supporters called an "extraordinary party conference" to expel al-Bakr and other rivals from the party. Bakr-loyal Ba'ath officers arrested them, after which on November 13 National Guard members loyal to al-Sa'di bombed targets in Baghdad and rampaged through the capital for five days. al-Bakr summoned President Arif, who as commander-in-chief of the army restored peace and order with the military coup of November 18, 1963. Despite having collaborated with al-Bakr to remove al-Sa'di, Arif purged Ba'athists, including al-Bakr, from his new government.

References 

Members of the Regional Command of the Arab Socialist Ba'ath Party – Iraq Region
Government ministers of Iraq
1928 births
1977 deaths
Iraqi politicians
Arab Socialist Ba'ath Party – Iraq Region politicians
Members of the National Command of the Ba'ath Party
Interior ministers of Iraq